Jakiya Whitfeld (born 11 June 2001) is an Australian professional rugby league footballer who currently plays for the Newcastle Knights in the NRL Women's Premiership.

Background
Born in Canberra, Australian Capital Territory, Whitfeld grew up in Bathurst and played rugby union for Central West growing up.

Playing career

Early years
In 2018, Whitfeld represented Australia in rugby sevens, playing in the World Schools Rugby 7s Tournament and the Oceania Rugby 7s Championship, then later representing the Sydney University side. In 2019, she represented Australia at the World Sevens Series. In 2020, she injured her ACL, causing her to miss out on selection for the Tokyo Olympics.

2022
In 2022, Whitfeld represented Australia again at the World Sevens Series. On 21 July, she signed with the Newcastle Knights in the NRL Women's Premiership for the 2022 season. In round 3 of the 2022 NRLW season, she made her NRLW debut for the Knights against the Parramatta Eels.

References

External links
Newcastle Knights profile
World Rugby profile

2001 births
Australian rugby league players
Newcastle Knights (NRLW) players
Rugby league wingers
Rugby league players from Canberra
Living people